Paraglenea velutinofasciata is a species of beetle in the family Cerambycidae. It was described by Maurice Pic in 1939.

References

Saperdini
Beetles described in 1939